Lancaster station might refer to:

Lancaster station (Pennsylvania), an Amtrak station in the United States
Lancaster station (California), a Metrolink station in the United States
Lancaster railway station, formerly Lancaster Castle railway station, England
Lancaster railway station (1840–1849), England, the first station in Lancaster, England, open from 1840 to 1849
Lancaster Green Ayre railway station, England, from 1848 to 1966
Lancaster bus station, England

See also
Lancaster (disambiguation)